The Wu-Tang Clan is a New York City-based hip hop musical group, consisting of ten American rappers: RZA, GZA, Method Man, Raekwon, Ghostface Killah, Inspectah Deck, U-God, Masta Killa, Cappadonna and the late Ol' Dirty Bastard.

One of the most critically and commercially successful hip hop groups of all time, Wu-Tang Clan rose to fame with their uncompromising brand of hardcore rap music. Since their debut, they have introduced or launched the careers of numerous other artists and groups, and already in 1994 there were credited to be over 300 Wu-Tang Clan affiliates, known as the Wu-Tang Killa Bees, consisting of rappers, producers, and record label CEOs.

Albums

Studio albums

EPs

Compilation albums

Singles

Other appearances

See also
 RZA discography
 GZA discography
 Ol' Dirty Bastard discography
 Method Man discography
 Raekwon discography
 Ghostface Killah discography
 Inspectah Deck discography
 U-God discography
 Masta Killa discography
 Cappadonna discography
 Wu-Tang Clan videography

Notes

References

General
 
Specific

External links
 Official Wu-Tang Site
 Wu Music Group

Hip hop discographies
Discography
Discographies of American artists